Polyaniline (PANI) is a conducting polymer and organic semiconductor of the semi-flexible rod polymer family. The compound has been of interest since the 1980s because of its electrical conductivity and mechanical properties. Polyaniline is one of the most studied conducting polymers.

Historical development
Polyaniline was discovered in the 19th century by F. Ferdinand Runge (1794–1867), Carl Fritzsche (1808–1871), John Lightfoot (1831–1872), and Henry
Letheby (1816–1876). Lightfoot studied the oxidation of aniline, which had been isolated only 20 years previously. He developed the first commercially successful route to the dye called Aniline black. The first definitive report of polyaniline did not occur until 1862, which included an electrochemical method for the determination of small quantities of aniline.

From the early 20th century on, occasional reports about the structure of PANI were published.

Polymerized from the inexpensive aniline, polyaniline can be found in one of three idealized oxidation states:
 leucoemeraldine – white/clear & colorless (C6H4NH)n
 emeraldine – green for the emeraldine salt, blue for the emeraldine base ([C6H4NH]2[C6H4N]2)n
 (per)nigraniline – blue/violet (C6H4N)n

In the figure, x equals half the degree of polymerization (DP). Leucoemeraldine with n = 1, m = 0 is the fully reduced state. Pernigraniline is the fully oxidized state (n = 0, m = 1) with imine links instead of amine links. Studies have shown that most forms of polyaniline are one of the three states or physical mixtures of these components. The emeraldine (n = m = 0.5) form of polyaniline, often referred to as emeraldine base (EB), is neutral, if doped (protonated) it is called emeraldine salt (ES), with the imine nitrogens protonated by an acid. Protonation helps to delocalize the otherwise trapped diiminoquinone-diaminobenzene state. Emeraldine base is regarded as the most useful form of polyaniline due to its high stability at room temperature and the fact that, upon doping with acid, the resulting emeraldine salt form of polyaniline is highly electrically conducting. Leucoemeraldine and pernigraniline are poor conductors, even when doped with an acid.

The colour change associated with polyaniline in different oxidation states can be used in sensors and electrochromic devices. Polyaniline sensors typically exploit changes in electrical conductivity between the different oxidation states or doping levels. Treatment of emeraldine with acids increases the electrical conductivity by up to ten orders of magnitude. Undoped polyaniline has a conductivity of  S/m, whereas conductivities of  S/m can be achieved by doping to 4% HBr. The same material can be prepared by oxidation of leucoemeraldine.

Synthesis
Although the synthetic methods to produce polyaniline are quite simple, the mechanism of polymerization is probably complex. The formation of leucoemeraldine can be described as follows, where [O] is a generic oxidant:

n C6H5NH2 + [O] → [C6H4NH]n + H2O

A common oxidant is ammonium persulfate in 1 M hydrochloric acid (other acids can be used). The polymer precipitates as an unstable dispersion with micrometer-scale particulates.

(Per)nigraniline is prepared by oxidation of the emeraldine base with a peracid:
{[C6H4NH]2[C6H4N]2}n + RCO3H → [C6H4N]n + H2O + RCO2H

Processing
The synthesis of polyaniline nanostructures is facile.

Using surfactant dopants, the polyaniline can be made dispersible and hence useful for practical applications. Bulk synthesis of polyaniline nanofibers has been researched extensively.

A multi-stage model for the formation of emeraldine base is proposed. In the first stage of the reaction the pernigraniline PS salt oxidation state is formed. In the second stage pernigraniline is reduced to the emeraldine salt as aniline monomer gets oxidized to the radical cation. In the third stage this radical cation couples with ES salt. This process can be followed by light scattering analysis which allows the determination of the absolute molar mass. According to one study in the first step a DP of 265 is reached with the DP of the final polymer at 319. Approximately 19% of the final polymer is made up of the aniline radical cation which is formed during the reaction.

Polyaniline is typically produced in the form of long-chain polymer aggregates, surfactant (or dopant) stabilized nanoparticle dispersions, or stabilizer-free nanofiber dispersions depending on the supplier and synthetic route. Surfactant or dopant stabilized polyaniline dispersions have been available for commercial sale since the late 1990s.

Potential applications
The major applications are printed circuit board manufacturing: final finishes, used in millions of m2 every year, antistatic and ESD coatings, and corrosion protection. Polyaniline and its derivatives are also used as the precursor for the production of N-doped carbon materials through high-temperature heat treatment. Printed emeraldine polyaniline-based sensors have also gained much attention for widespread applications where devices are typically fabricated via screen, inkjet or aerosol jet printing.

References

Organic polymers
Polyamines
Molecular electronics
Organic semiconductors
Polyelectrolytes
Conductive polymers